Parlikad  is a village in Thrissur district in the state of Kerala, India.

References

Villages in Thrissur district